Falaki Shirvani was a Persian poet who served at the court of the Shirvanshah Manuchihr III. A student of the poet Khaqani, Falaki played a leading role in the early development of the habsiyat (prison poetry) genre. Like other poets of his time, Falaki was imprisoned due to the libel spread by his rivals. It has been surmised Falaki soon died after his release, as a result of the stress he had endured there.

Biography 
Falaki was born in 1107, in the city of Shamakhi in Shirvan. The city served as the capital of the rulers of Shirvan, the Shirvanshahs. "Falaki" was his pen name, his real name being Muhammad. Due to the former meaning "astronomer" and the poet Khaqani mentioning that Falaki was "aware of the mysteries of the nine spheres" it could be surmised that Falaki was a professional astronomer. However, this could have also been a word-play by Khaqani. Falaki was a student of Khaqani, despite being older.

According to a story reported by later biographers such as Dawlatshah Samarqandi, both Falaki and Khaqani were students of the Abu'l-Ala Ganjavi. The latter's daughter is eventually married with Khaqani, whilst Falaki was given 20,000 dirhams, which he was let down by. Abu'l-Ala Ganjavi told Falaki that with that money he could buy fifty Turkish handmaidens extremely more beautiful than Khaqani's new wife. Iranologist Anna Livia Beelaert does not consider this story to be real, arguing that no parts of it is mentioned in Khaqani's writings, which mentions both Falaki and Abu'l-Ala Ganjavi. Falaki had a wife who died shortly after giving birth to their daughter. The rest of his relatives (with the exception of his daughter) also died. Like Khaqani and Abu'l-Ala Ganjavi, Falaki served as a court poet of the Shirvanshah Manuchihr III.

Like other poets of his time (Khaqani, Mujir al-Din Baylaqani and probably Abu'l-Ala Ganjavi), Falaki was imprisoned due to the libel spread by his rivals. His imprisonment took place in the fortress of Shabaran, where he stayed for some time. After being freed, Falaki wrote an ode in which he claims that his confinement had almost killed him and left him a mere skeleton. It is uncertain whether Falaki was allowed back into the royal court or not. The Indian scholar Hadi Hasan, noting that Khaqani reported Falaki's death as "premature", considered it more plausible that Falaki soon died as a result of the stress he had endured during his imprisonment.

The death of Manuchihr III is not mentioned in Falaki's writings, which indicates that Falaki died before him. Based on this, the suggestion by authors such as Taqi Kashi that Falaki died in 1181/82 has been dismissed by historian Francois de Blois. According to Taqi Kashi, Falaki was buried in Shamakhi. Khaqani dedicated an eulogy to him.

Works 

Falaki is known to have authored a Persian divan, of which 1512 verses have survived. In 1929, Hadi Hasan published his collection of Falaki's poems, which he had gathered from the Munich anthology and poetry referenced in other works. In 1958, he published a updated version, based on newly found poems in the Madras manuscript and a revised version of his previous collection. The only ruler that appears in Falaki's work is Manuchihr III, whom Falaki describes in several scenarios, such as his victory against the Alans and "Khazars" (Kipchaks); how he seized chunks of Arran; how he had the cities of Kardinan and Sa'dun constructed; and how he restored the Bakilani dam.

Falaki is the first known Shirvani composer of the habsiyat (prison poetry) genre, and also played an role in its early development. There are three important words in the genre, gham (sorrow), mihnat (affliction) and ranj (suffering). These words began to set themselves apart from one another at the early stage of the development of genre. Gham communicates a gloomy resignation. Mihnat conveys enduring injustice that is connected to a universal state. Poets in Shirvan started to use the word mihnat to convey the same physical tiredness as its equivalent ranj. This lexicon was first assembled by Falaki;

The prison poetry genre was created by a Persian poet under the Ghaznavids, Masud Sa'd Salman, whom Falaki claimed to be below him in terms of style. Falaki displayed anxiety of influence, trying to make the accomplishments of Masud Sa'd Salman seem less important, whilst also using the latter's trademark genre. Historian Rebecca Gould considers Falaki's impact in prison poetry to pale in comparison to Masud Sa'd Salman's, but maintains that he still played an important role in the genre, contributing to its geographical and cross-generational transmission.

Falaki considered himself to be on the same level as Abu Nuwas (died 810) and Abu Tammam (died 846). The Czech orientalist Jan Rypka considered it "strange" that Falaki did not think of any contemporary poet who merited mention. Both Salman Savaji (died 1376) and Ismat Bukhara'i (died 1425/26) are known to have copied Falaki's style of poetry, though the former never admitted it. According to Rebecca Gould, the works of Falaki, Khaqani, Abu'l-Ala Ganjavi and Mujir al-Din Baylaqani fully supports the claim made by academics that the Persianate Caucasus developed a distinctive literary tradition comparable to that of Bukhara, Khwarazm, and Khurasan.

References

Sources 

 
 
 
 
 
 
 
 
 
 

1107 births
1150s deaths
12th-century Persian-language writers
12th-century Persian-language poets
People from Shamakhi
12th-century Iranian people
Poets of the Shirvanshahs